Buerenia is a genus of fungi in the family Protomycetaceae. It was described in 1975. Species of Buerenia are parasitic on Apiaceae plants, on which they cause swellings and blisters on leaves and stems.

References

External links

Taphrinomycetes